Wargame Construction Set III: Age of Rifles 1846-1905 (or simply Age of Rifles) is a turn-based computer wargame for MS-DOS, written by Norm Koger. It was published in 1996 by Strategic Simulations. It is the third game in the Wargame Construction Set series, following Wargame Construction Set (1986) and Wargame Construction Set II: Tanks! (1994).

Scope 
Age of Rifles simulates battles throughout the era of percussion rifles, roughly comprising the second half of the 19th century. To this end, several dozen battle scenarios are provided in the game. Most of them are set during the American Civil War, but scenarios from the Crimean War, the Anglo-Zulu War, Afghan Wars, the Prusso-Austrian and the Franco-Prussian War, and the Russo-Japanese War are also included.

Scenarios can be played individually or within the framework of a campaign, where the outcome of earlier battles influences the course of later battles. In addition, random scenarios are available as well.

There is also a scenario editor with which users can develop and share their own battles, and thereby extend the scope of the game. Scenarios as early as the Battle of Hastings have been generated this way.

Gameplay 
The game can be played with two human players, or with the computer taking over one or both sides. An option for playing out battles via e-Mail is also provided.

Current Status 
There is still a small community of players who develop and publish new scenarios for AoR.

Depending on the individual PC configuration, AoR may work as-is under Windows XP and Windows 7, or may require DOSBox to run.

Reception

The game was a finalist for Computer Gaming Worlds 1996 "Wargame of the Year" award, which ultimately went to Battleground 4: Shiloh.

References

External links 
 
 A collection of some 250 scenarios created by AoR fans
 Yahoo group for AoR aficionados

1996 video games
Computer wargames
DOS games
DOS-only games
Strategic Simulations games
Turn-based strategy video games
Video games developed in the United States